The True Church of Jesus Christ of Latter Day Saints or True Mormon Church was a denomination of the Latter Day Saint movement. It was founded in the spring of 1844 in Nauvoo, Illinois, by leaders dissenting from the Church of Jesus Christ of Latter Day Saints.

The True Church's president was William Law, a former counselor to the movement's founder, Joseph Smith (then President of the Church). Law was joined by his brother, Wilson Law, along with Robert D. Foster, Charles A. Foster, Francis M. Higbee, Chauncey L. Higbee and Charles Ivins. Members of the True Church believed that "Mormonism" as it had been originally practiced was true, but that the practice of plural marriage in particular was a corruption. William Law did not claim to be a prophet, but merely the president of the church. The church taught that Smith was a "fallen prophet".

This group was responsible for printing the Nauvoo Expositor, which was also critical of Smith and polygamy, leading to his death and contributing to the expulsion of the Latter Day Saints from Nauvoo.

References

Steven L. Shields, Divergent Paths of the Restoration: A History of the Latter Day Saint Movement, Restoration Research, Los Angeles: 1990, p. 29.
Nauvoo [Illinois] Expositor, vol. 1, no. 1, June 7, 1844, Publishers: William Law et alia. See text and facsimile.

External links

1844 establishments in Illinois
Christian denominations established in the 19th century
Defunct Latter Day Saint denominations
Latter Day Saint movement in Illinois
Organizations based in Illinois
Pre–succession crisis denominations in the Latter Day Saint movement
Religious organizations established in 1844